Xudoyberdi To'xtaboyev (17 December 1932 – 21 March 2021) was an Uzbek writer of children's stories.

Life and career
To'xtaboyev was born in the city of Fergana in 1932. After he finished primary and secondary school, he studied at the Department of Philology at the University of Central Asia from 1950 until 1955. He worked for a time as a newspaper journalist, including at Tashkent haqiqati (The Truth of Tashkent) and Qizil O’zbekiston (Red Uzbekistan), and he was the editor of the monthly magazine Guliston. From 1972 until 1977, he worked as chief editor at Yosh Gvardiya (Young Guard) publishing house, and as assistant to the chief editor at Shark Yulduzi (Western Star) newspaper. In those days, he also worked as chief of editing at Yosh Kuch (Young Strength) newspaper.

To'xtaboyev began his career as a children's writer in 1958. He created the collection of stories Shoshqoloq (Hasty) in 1962, followed by other collections: Yosh Gvardiya (Young Guard), Sir Ochildi (The Secret Revealed), and Sehrli Qolpoqcha (A Magic Hat) (1965). To'xtaboyev's writing was popular throughout Uzbekistan, and many children read his books as part of their school studies.
 
To'xtaboyev worked at the Kamalak publishing house as an editor, and then as lead editor. From 1960 until 1970, his most popular books were translated into other languages.

Works
To'xtaboyev is famous for his humorous novels. His books touch on themes including honesty in adults, love, loyalty, and kindness. 
His stories include:  Sarik devni minib (Riding a Yellow Giant) (1969) and Sarik devning o'limi (Death of the Yellow Giant) (1973).  Other works include Besh Bolali Yigitcha (Parent of 5 Children), Qasoskorning oltin boshi (The Golden Head of the Avenger), Yillar and Yo'llar (Ways and Years) in 1983, and Sehrgarlar jangi (The Battle of Magicians). For his contribution to literature, To'xtaboyev won the Khamza Prize and “The National Writer of Uzbekistan” in 1991 when Uzbekistan gained its independence from the Soviet Union.

See also

Tohir Malik
Hamid Olimjon

References

External links 
About his creativity
"The kingdom of rabbits" download

Uzbekistani male writers
Uzbekistani children's writers
1932 births
2021 deaths
20th-century Uzbekistani writers
20th-century male writers
People from Fergana